Danijel Prskalo (born 27 October 1990) is a Croatian footballer who plays as a forward for SC Weiz.

References

External links
 
 

1990 births
Living people
Sportspeople from Mostar
Croats of Bosnia and Herzegovina
Association football forwards
Croatian footballers
Croatia youth international footballers
SK Sturm Graz players
FC Schalke 04 II players
SC Wiener Neustadt players
SC Rheindorf Altach players
SC Ritzing players
TSV Hartberg players
Floridsdorfer AC players
SC Weiz players
Regionalliga players
Austrian Regionalliga players
Austrian Football Bundesliga players
2. Liga (Austria) players
Croatian expatriate footballers
Expatriate footballers in Germany
Croatian expatriate sportspeople in Germany
Expatriate footballers in Austria
Croatian expatriate sportspeople in Austria